Sarah Manninen (born November 6, 1976) is a Canadian film, television and stage actress, better known for her appearances on film The Prince and Me and series The Line.

Career
A Finnish Canadian, Manninen graduated from Resurrection Catholic Secondary School in Kitchener, Regional Municipality of Waterloo, Ontario, in 1995, and from George Brown Theatre School. She has a degree in political science and belongs to the Liberal Party of Canada.

She was nominated for a Gemini Award for the BBC/CTV film Aka Albert Walker.

Select theatre credits include, Amiel Gladstone's The Wedding Pool (Belfry Theatre) and (Atelier du Rhin Théâtre de la Manufacture). George F. Walker's Better Living and Escape From Happiness (Factory Theatre) and David Rotenberg's production of The Dwarf (Equity Showcase Theatre).

Filmography

References

External links
 

1976 births
Living people
20th-century Canadian actresses
21st-century Canadian actresses
Actresses from Ontario
Canadian film actresses
Canadian people of Finnish descent
Canadian stage actresses
Canadian television actresses
People from Waterloo, Ontario